The 2022 London local elections took place on 5 May 2022, as part of the 2022 United Kingdom local elections. All London borough councillor seats were up for election. Mayoral elections took place in Hackney, Lewisham, Newham and Tower Hamlets, with Croydon electing a mayor for the first time following a local referendum in October 2021.

The election saw Labour gain majority control of Barnet, Wandsworth and Westminster councils whilst the Conservatives gained majority control of Harrow Council and the Aspire Party gained control of Tower Hamlets Council, both from Labour. Labour also lost Croydon Council to no overall control. Of the four existing mayoralties, Labour held three but lost the position of mayor of Tower Hamlets to Lutfur Rahman of the Aspire Party, who had previously been removed from the same office after being found guilty of "corrupt or illegal practices" by an election court. The Conservative candidate Jason Perry won the newly created Croydon mayoralty.

Background
The previous borough council elections in May 2018 saw the London Labour Party achieve their best result in over 45 years, winning 44% of the vote, 1,128 councillors and control of 21 councils. This represented the party's second-best result in a London local election, only surpassed slightly by its 1971 total. The London Conservatives, lost 92 seats to finish with 508 councillors, its lowest-ever tally of seats in a London local election. The London Liberal Democrats won two councils from the Conservatives, the London Green Party won a total of 11 council seats and support for the UK Independence Party collapsed, with the party losing all of its seats. In the 2019 general election, there was no net change in the number of seats for each party, although several seats changed hands. The biggest changes in vote share were for Labour, who received 48% of the vote across the city but saw a fall of 6.5 percentage points, and the Liberal Democrats, who were up 6.1 percentage points compared to the previous 2017 general election.

Newham and Tower Hamlets held local referendums in May 2021 on whether to abolish their mayoral positions and return to a leader and cabinet system. Both resulted in voters choosing to retain the mayoral model. In the same month, the Labour candidate Sadiq Khan was re-elected as the mayor of London, and the 2021 London Assembly election resulted in small gains for the Conservatives, Green Party and Liberal Democrats at the expense of Labour and the UK Independence Party. Croydon Council held a referendum on 7 October 2021 on whether to adopt a mayor position. The result was to change to the mayoral system, with the first mayor being due to be elected alongside the council election in 2022.

Twenty-five of the thirty-two boroughs will be electing councillors under new ward boundaries following reviews by the Local Government Boundary Commission for England.

Campaign
In January 2022, the Conservative peer Robert Hayward said that in the wake of the Westminster lockdown parties controversy, his party risked losing control of Wandsworth, Westminster, Barnet and Hillingdon London Borough Councils. Polls of London in January and March 2022 showed Labour with a large lead over the Conservatives. Dave Hill in OnLondon wrote that the poll results would make Labour more confident of making gains in Barnet, Wandsworth, Hillingdon and Westminster, and of winning the new directly-elected mayoralty of Croydon despite financial issues in the borough. He also wrote that the Conservatives were aiming to make gains in Harrow. Nick Bowes, the chief executive of the Centre for London, wrote that Labour gaining control of Barnet and Wandsworth councils would "be a good night for the party in London". The academics Colin Rallings and Michael Thrasher wrote that Labour's strong result in the 2018 election meant "it may be hard for Labour to make much headway or for the Conservatives to fall much further".

A poll by Survation on what issues would affect how people voted showed Council Tax, the Westminster lockdown parties controversy, and social care quality as the main issues, with far fewer voters ranking Low Traffic Neighbourhood schemes as one of the issues that would most affect how they vote.

The Liberal Democrats launched their local election campaign on 6 April. The party were targeting seats on Merton Council. Labour launched their London local election campaign on 9 April, with the national party leader Keir Starmer and the mayor of London saying that the Conservative government had "abandoned" London and were not concerned about the rising cost of living.

The journalist Ben Walker, writing in the New Statesman, modelled what the election results would look like according to the voteshares in an April poll by Opinium. His model showed Labour gaining control of Wandsworth and Barnet, with 1,157 to 1,188 seats across the city, while the Conservatives would win between 428 and 452 seats, the Liberal Democrats would win between 149 and 179 seats, and the Green Party would win between 11 and 22 seats.

Council results

Council

Councillors
The table below shows the number of councillors won by each party for each council in London. The shaded cells show the party or parties in each council's governing administration.

Mayors

Opinion polling

Ward result maps

London-wide 
The map below shows the results for each ward across the whole of Greater London.

By borough

See also 

 2022 City of London Corporation election

Notes

References

Council elections in Greater London
London
Local elections
May 2022 events in the United Kingdom
 
2022